Yaqubabad (also Romanized as Ya‘qūbābād) is a village in Zahray-ye Bala Rural District, in the Central District of Buin Zahra County, Qazvin Province, Iran. At the 2006 census, its population was 35, in 9 families.

References 

Populated places in Buin Zahra County